Manuel Casal y Aguado (April 20, 1751 – April 6, 1837), better known by his anagrammatic pseudonym Lucas Alemán y Aguado, was a Spanish polymath and poet.  In addition to being appointed Dean of the Academia Médico-Quirúrgica Matritense, he was also a distinguished journalist, poet, and playwright.

1751 births
1837 deaths
Spanish dramatists and playwrights
Spanish male dramatists and playwrights
Spanish journalists
Spanish poets
Spanish male poets
18th-century Spanish physicians
19th-century Spanish physicians
18th-century Spanish writers
19th-century Spanish poets
19th-century male writers
18th-century male writers